Pula: Botswana Journal of African Studies, established in 1978, is a peer-reviewed academic journal covering studies on Africa, especially Southern Africa.

In 2006 Pula was one of a group of African journals selected by Michigan State University's "African e-Journals Project" to be digitized and placed online. Only articles up to 2003 are currently available from that archive, but an online version is available beginning with the 2012 issues.

References

African studies journals
Publications established in 1978
English-language journals